Suffield may refer to:


Places
 Suffield, Alberta, Canada, a hamlet
 CFB Suffield, a Canadian Forces base north of Suffield
 British Army Training Unit Suffield, stationed at CFB Suffield
 Suffield, Norfolk, England, a village and civil parish
 Suffield, North Yorkshire, England, a hamlet
 Suffield, Connecticut, US, a town
 Suffield Township, Portage County, Ohio, US
 Suffield (CDP), Ohio, US, an unincorporated community and census-designated place
 Suffield Point, King George Island, Antarctica

Schools
 Suffield Academy, a private preparatory school in Suffield, Connecticut
 Suffield High School, West Suffield, Connecticut
 Suffield University, an unaccredited internet school

People
 Melissa Suffield (born 1992), English actress
 Walter Suffield (died 1257), Bishop of Norwich

Other uses
 Baron Suffield, a title in the Peerage of Great Britain